The Russian military intervention in the Syrian civil war began in September 2015, after a request by the Syrian government for military aid against rebel and jihadist groups. The intervention initially involved air strikes by Russian aircraft from the Khmeimim base against targets primarily in north-western Syria, and against Syrian opposition militant groups opposed to the Syrian government, including the Free Syrian Army, the Islamic State of Iraq and the Levant (ISIL), al-Nusra Front (al-Qaeda in Syria) and the Army of Conquest. Russian special operations forces, military advisors and private military contractors like the Wagner Group were also sent to Syria to support the Assad regime, which was on the verge of collapse. Prior to the intervention, Russian involvement in the Syrian Civil War had mainly consisted of supplying the Syrian Army with arms and equipment. At the end of December 2017, the Russian government announced that its troops would be deployed to Syria permanently.

Shortly after the operation began, Russian officials were cited as saying that, apart from fighting terrorist organisations such as the Islamic State, Russia′s goals include helping the Syrian government retake territory from various anti-government groups that are labelled by the United States and the American-led intervention in Syria as "moderate opposition", with a broader geopolitical objective being to roll back U.S. influence. In a televised interview in October 2015, Russian president Vladimir Putin said that the military operation had been thoroughly prepared in advance. He defined Russia′s goal in Syria as "stabilising the legitimate power in Syria and creating the conditions for political compromise".

By the end of 2017, the intervention produced significant gains for the Syrian government, including the recapture of Palmyra from the Islamic State in March 2016, retaking Aleppo from a coalition of other Islamist groups in December 2016, and breaking the IS siege of Deir ez-Zor and re-capturing the city in November 2017. In early January 2017, the Chief of the General Staff of the Russian Armed Forces Valery Gerasimov said that, overall, the Russian Air Force had carried out 19,160 combat missions and delivered 71,000 strikes on "the infrastructure of terrorists". At the end of December 2017, the Russian defence minister said that the Russian military had eliminated several thousand terrorists, while 48,000 Russian armed forces members had "gained combat experience" during the Russian operation in Syria. The intervention also swelled Russia's position in its great-power competition with the United States, guaranteed its access to the Eastern Mediterranean, and bolstered its capacity to conduct military operations across the wider region, such as the Red Sea and Libya.

The Syrian Network for Human Rights (SNHR) and the Violations Documentation Centre (VDC) stated that from the inception of the intervention in September 2015 until the end of February 2016, Russian air strikes killed at least 2,000 civilians. SNHR's report stated that civilian deaths from the Russian offensive had exceeded those caused by the Islamic State and the Syrian Army since Russian operations began. The UK-based pro-opposition Syrian Observatory for Human Rights (SOHR) issued a slightly lower estimate: at least 1,700 civilians, including more than 200 children. Weapons used included unguided bombs, cluster bombs, incendiaries similar to white phosphorus and thermobaric weapons. By the end of September 2017, the SOHR stated that Russian airstrikes killed around 5,703 civilians, about a quarter of them children, along with 4,258 ISIL fighters and 3,893 militants from the al-Nusra Front and other rebel forces. The Russian campaign has been criticised by numerous international bodies for indiscriminate aerial bombings across Syria that target schools and civilian infrastructures and carpet bombing of cities like Aleppo. The findings of BMJ Global Health and a UN investigation report published in 2020 revealed that the Russian Air Force (RuAF) also "weaponized health-care" through a deliberate policy of bombing ambulances, clinical facilities and hospitals.

The intervention polarized governments along predictable lines. Countries with close diplomatic and economic ties to Russia, including China, Egypt, Iraq and Belarus, have generally supported the intervention, while reactions by governments close to the US were usually critical, with many governments denouncing Russia for its role in the war and highlighting its complicity in the Syrian regime's war crimes. Human Rights Watch and Amnesty International have stated that Russia is committing war crimes and deliberately targeting civilians. The United States government has condemned the intervention and imposed economic sanctions against Russia for supporting the Syrian government. Officials at the United Nations have condemned the Russian intervention and said that Russia was committing war crimes. Russian authorities have dismissed this denunciation, including accusations of "barbarism", as false and politically motivated, thereby eliciting even stronger condemnation from governments which support the rebel groups.

Background and preparation phase

The Syrian civil war has been waged since 2011 between multiple opposition (anti-government) groupings and the government as well, as their local and foreign support bases. Since 2014, a significant part of Syria′s territory had been claimed by the Islamic State of Iraq and the Levant, an entity internationally recognised as terrorist. In the north-west of the country, the main opposition faction is the al-Qaeda-affiliated al-Nusra Front, allied with numerous other smaller Islamist groups, some of which operated under the umbrella of the Free Syrian Army (FSA) that was supported and armed by the United States and its regional allies. Since September 2014, the U.S.-led coalition had conducted airstrikes in Syria against ISIL, which was widely seen as unsuccessful in achieving their goals.

According to Russian and Syrian officials, in July 2015, the Syrian President Bashar al-Assad made a formal request to Russia for air strikes combating international terrorism, while laying out Syria's military problems. According to media reports with reference to anonymous sources, after a series of major setbacks suffered by the Syrian government forces in the first half of 2015, a political agreement was reached between Russia and Syria to intensify the Russian involvement; Qasem Soleimani, commander of the Iran′s Quds Force visited Moscow in July to work out the details of the joint campaign (Soleimani′s visit was denied by Russian officials).

In August 2015, Russia began to send Russian-operated warplanes, T-90 tanks and artillery, as well as combat troops to an airbase near the port city of Latakia in Syria.

On 26 August 2015, a treaty was signed between Russia and Syria that stipulated terms and conditions of use by Russia of Syria's Hmeimim airport, free of charge and with no time limit. The treaty, ratified by Russia′s parliament in October 2016, grants Russia′s personnel and their family members jurisdictional immunity and other privileges as envisaged by Vienna Convention on Diplomatic Relations.

In September 2015, Russia′s warships of the Black Sea Fleet reached the area of eastern Mediterranean.

At the end of September, a joint information centre in Baghdad was set up by Iran, Iraq, Russia and Syria to coordinate their operations against ISIL (in the newsmedia the centre is also referred to as "Joint Operations Room in Baghdad known as the 4 + 1" implying the Lebanese Shia militia Hezbollah, in addition to the 4 states). According to Russian foreign minister Sergey Lavrov′s statement made in mid-October 2015, prior to the start of its operations in Syria, Russia invited the United States to join the Baghdad-based information center but received what he called an "unconstructive" response. According to Alexander Yakovenko, Ambassador of Russia to the United Kingdom, the Russian government received a similar rebuttal from the UK government. In late December 2015, Turkey′s president Recep Erdogan said that he had declined Russian president′s offer to join this alliance as he "could not sit alongside a president [Assad] whose legitimacy" was dubious to him".

On 30 September 2015, the upper house of the Russian Federal Assembly, the Federation Council, granted the request by Russian President Vladimir Putin to deploy the Russian Air Force in Syria. On the same day, the Russian representative to the joint information centre arrived at the U.S. Embassy in Baghdad and requested that any United States forces in the targeted area in Syria leave immediately. An hour later, the Russian aircraft based in the government-held territory began conducting airstrikes ostensibly against ISIL and other rebel targets.

Prior to the start of the Russian operation in Syria as well as afterwards, Russian analysts said that Russia′s military build-up in Syria was aimed inter alia at ending the de facto political and diplomatic isolation that the West had imposed on Putin in connection with the situation in Ukraine.

Prevention of Qatar-Turkey pipeline 

In an October 2016 TV interview, General Leonid Ivashov said that Russia's engagement in the conflict would allow it to block proposed pipelines between the Middle East and Europe, and thus ensure the dominance of Gazprom.  Involvement of Qatar and Turkey in the opposition to Assad was also interpreted as driven the plans to construct a pipeline through Syria in 2012 while Syrian government explicitly rejected it "to protect the interests of [its] Russian ally, which is Europe's top supplier of natural gas."

Operations by Russian military forces

September–October 2015

The first series of air strikes took place on 30 September 2015 in areas around the cities of Homs and Hama, targeting the mainstream opposition. Russian warplanes attacked rebel positions "in al-Rastan, Talbiseh and Zafaraniya in Homs province; Al-Tilol al-Hmer in Quneitra province; Aydoun, a village on the outskirts of the town of Salamiyah; Deer Foul, between Hama and Homs; and the outskirts of Salamiyah". In total, 20 flights were made. Most of the initial airstrikes targeted positions of the Chechen fighters, Islamic Front's Jaysh al-Islam (Army of Islam), and Free Syrian Army.

According to Hezbollah media outlet Al Mayadeen, the Saudi/Turkish-backed Army of Conquest around Jisr ash-Shugour was bombed on 1 October by Russian planes; at least 30 air strikes were carried out. Another series of Russian airstrikes carried out that same day hit ISIL positions in Raqqa governorate.

Al-Masdar reported that in the morning of 2 October, the Russian Air Force launched four airstrikes on ISIL in the ancient Syriac city of Al-Qaryatayn, and the T4-Palmyra highway, Homs province. An ISIL command and control center was destroyed in a single airstrike in Al-Qaryatayn, while an ISIL convoy on their way to the Teefor-Palmyra highway was attacked. Following the airstrikes, the Syrian Army and National Defence Forces pushed ISIL out of the town of Mheen towards Al-Qaryatayn after a two-hour engagement that killed 18 militants and destroyed two technicals mounted with ZU-23-2s. Syrian forces then launched a counter-attack south-west of Al-Qaryatayn to recover the main road.

On the same day, the Russian Air Force began bombing Al-Nusra Front positions in al-Rastan and Talbiseh in the Homs province. Later, they proceeded with bombing Al-Nusra in Kafr Zita, Al-Ghaab Plains, Kafr Nabl, Kafr Sijnah, and Al-Rakaya in the Hama province. The Syrian Air Force and the Russian Air Force jointly bombed Al-Nusra in Jisr al-Shughur. At night, the Russian Air Force targeted ISIL with 11 airstrikes over Raqqa while targeting electrical grids outside it, two airstrikes over Shadadi-Hasakah highway, and three airstrikes in Mayadin, Deir ez-Zor province. The primary ISIL military base in Tabaqa Military Airport was also attacked, with the barracks being destroyed in two airstrikes. Near the Military Airport, an ISIL weapons supply depot in Al-'Ajrawi Farms was also bombed. At the same time, the ISIL primary headquarters in Tabaqa National Hospital was heavily damaged in a Russian airstrike, according to pro-government sources. In Al-Hasakah province, the Russian Air Force targeted ISIL in Al-Shadadi and Al-Houl, while the Syrian Air Force attacked an ISIL convoy along the Deir ez-Zor-Hasakah highway.

On 3 October, reports indicated that Hezbollah and Iranian fighters were preparing major ground offensives to be coordinated with Russian airstrikes. According to CNN, the Russian defense ministry said its soldiers bombed nine ISIL positions near the group's de facto capital in Raqqa. At least 11 were killed in a reported double strike by Russia in Syria's Idlib province, according to opposition groups. During the day, according to pro-government sources, the Russian Air Force made four airstrikes over Al-Nusra controlled Jisr al-Shughur, and additional ones in Jabal Al-Zawiya, and Jabal al-Akrad. One of the targets was an Al-Nusra reinforcement convoy heading from Jisr al-Shughur to the northeast countryside of Latakia province.

On the morning of 7 October 2015, according to the Russian officials, four warships from the Russian Navy's Caspian Flotilla launched 26 3M-14T from Kalibr-NK system cruise missiles that hit 11 targets within Syrian territory. The missiles passed through Iranian and Iraqi airspace in order to reach their targets at a distance of well over about 1,500 kilometers (930 miles). The same day, Syrian ground forces were reported to carry out an offensive under Russian air cover. According to CNN citing unnamed United States military and intelligence officials, 4 of 26 cruise missiles on 8 October crashed in Iran, well before reaching their targets in Syria. Russia said all of its missiles hit their targets. Iran also denied any missile crash on its territory. Iranian defence ministry rejected any reports alleging that four of the 26 cruise missiles crashed in Iran saying the CNN reports are part of the West's "psychological warfare".

On 8 October 2015, the number of air raids increased significantly up to over 60 sorties a day, a tempo maintained for the next 2 days.  The Russian defense ministry announced on 9 October that up to sixty ISIL targets were hit in the past 24 hours, reportedly killing 300 militants in the most intense strikes so far. One of the raids targeted a Liwa al-Haqq base in the Raqqa Governorate using KAB-500KR precision-guided bombs, in which reportedly two senior ISIL commanders and up to 200 militants were killed, despite the lack of any connection between Liwa al-Haqq and ISIL. Another assault destroyed a former prison near Aleppo that was used by ISIL as a base and munitions depot, also killing scores of militants. Rebel training sites in the Latakia and Idlib provinces were reportedly hit as well. Meanwhile, ISIL militants made advances in the Aleppo area on 9 October, seizing several villages, including Tal Qrah, Tal Sousin, and Kfar Qares, in what the Associated Press called a "lightning attack". The attacks were unencumbered by either Russian or United States-led coalition airstrikes. The ISIL advance came at the expense of rebel groups also targeted by Russian and Syrian forces. In mid-October 2015, a joint Russian-Syrian-Iranian-Hezbollah offensive targeting rebels in Aleppo went ahead.
According to citizen journalist group Raqqa Is Being Slaughtered Silently, who started out opposing the Syrian Government, Russia lied about targeting ISIL in the early airstrikes and missiles around Raqqa. Between 17 September and 13 October they counted 36 Russian strikes against only 2 ISIL targets (with 4 ISIL deaths) and 22 civilian targets (with 70 civilian deaths plus injuries) included hospitals, a fire hall, at least one school and a highway fueling station.

November 2015

On 17 November 2015, in the wake of the Russian jet crash over Sinai and the Paris attacks, according to the Russian defence minister′s public report to the president of Russia Vladimir Putin, Russia employed the Russia-based Tu-160, Tu-95MSM, and Tu-22M3 long-range strategic bombers firing air-launched cruise missiles to hit what he said were the IS targets in Raqqa, Deir ez-Zor as well as targets in the provinces of Aleppo and Idlib. The Russian minister of defence said that, pursuant to Putin′s orders, the Russian aviation group - which, at the time, comprised more than 50 aircraft - begun further intensifying their campaign. In addition, Putin said he had issued orders for the cruiser Moskva that had been in eastern Mediterranean since the start of the Russian operations to "work as with an ally", with the French naval group led by flagship  that had been on its way to the eastern Mediterranean since early November. The following day, according to the Russian Defence ministry, strikes by long-range bombers firing cruise missiles in the same areas in Syria continued. The mass cruise missile strikes carried out against ISIS in Deir Ezzor province on 20 November resulted in the death of more than 600 militants according to the ministry.

A Russian Sukhoi Su-24 strike aircraft was shot down by a Turkish Air Force F-16 on 24 November 2015. The pilot was shot and killed by Syrian rebels while descending by parachute, and the weapon systems officer was later rescued by Russian forces. A Russian marine was injured during the rescue operation and later died en route to a medical center. In the video the rebels shout "Allah Akbar" over the dead body of a Russian pilot. According to Turkey, the planes disregarded the multiple warnings and were subsequently fired upon by Turkish F-16s patrolling the area. After the Turkish fire, one of the planes left Turkish airspace and the other crashed into Syrian territory. The Russian Ministry of Defense denied that any of their planes had violated Turkey's airspace, stating they had been flying south of the Yayladağı province and provided two maps showing two different stated routes of the airplane (one of them with "impossible" turns and maneuvers).

The incident followed incremental tensions between Russia and Turkey over reported repeated violations of Turkish airspace by Russian military jets (one of which Russia admitted) and the Turkish prime minister′s statement of 17 October that Turkey would not hesitate to shoot down airplanes violating its airspace.

Russia in response announced it would deploy additional air defense weapons in the area and accompany its bombers with fighter jets. On 26  November 2015, deployment of S-300 and S-400 anti-aircraft systems was reported by Russia′s official news media, to Latakia and on board the cruiser Moskva. At around the same time, Russia announced that it was preparing for more jet fighters and a new Russian combat brigade to be stationed at Shayrat Airbase in Homs once in service for aiding the Syrian government troops in their ongoing offensive against ISIL.

On 29 November 2015, Russian aircraft were reported to have struck targets in the Syrian Idlib province, including the town of Ariha that had been captured by the Army of Conquest 6 months prior, causing multiple casualties on the ground. Other targets hit included the Turkistan Islamic Party's office in Jisr al-Shughur and a relief office of Ahrar ash-Sham group in the town of Saraqib.

December 2015 – February 2016

On 1 December 2015, The Times, citing local sources and news media, reported that Russia was preparing to expand its military operations in Syria by opening the al-Shayrat airbase near the city of Homs, already home to Russian attack helicopters and a team that had arrived about a month prior.

On 8 December, the Russian defence minister announced that a Kilo-class submarine, Rostov-on-Don, had launched 3M14K cruise missiles while submerged, against ISIL targets in Raqqa Governorate, the first such strike from the Mediterranean Sea. He also reported to the president that pursuant to Putin′s order, since 5 December the Russian military had intensified airstrikes in Syria: it was reported that over the 3 days, Russian aircraft, including Tu-22M3 strategic bombers, had performed over 300 sorties engaging over 600 targets of different type.

On 11 December, in a televised meeting at the Defence ministry Vladimir Putin ordered the military in Syria to destroy any threatening targets: "I order you to act as tough as possible. Any target that poses a threat to Russian military grouping or ground infrastructure has to be destroyed immediately." He also appeared to suggest that the Russian military was now supporting the anti-government Free Syrian Army forces; however, the Kremlin spokesman later said that Russia was only supplying weapons to "the legitimate authorities of the Syrian Arab Republic".

On 16 December, Russia′s Defence minister Sergey Shoigu speaking to the members of the State Duma behind closed doors, mentioned a possible option of the Russian forces "reaching the Euphrates" in Syria.

On 19 December, Russian president Putin commended the performance of the Russian armed forces in Syria; he said that "so far not all of our capabilities have been used" and that "more military means" might be employed there "if deemed necessary".

On 21 December, the longest offensive of the year since Russian forces got involved back in September yielded important gains. According to pro-government sources and social media accounts, these included the recapture of the strategic Khanasser–Ithriya Highway from ISIL and capturing of the main rebel strongholds of Al-Hader and Khan Tuman, cutting the Aleppo–Damascus highway and leaving them in control of three-quarters of the southern Aleppo countryside. Heavy Russian airstrikes facilitated the pace of the Syrian Army which also saw the deployment of Russian special forces of the GRU for the first time in the war as military advisors, proving to be instrumental and effective against both ISIL and the rebels and their respective allies.

On 25 December 2015, Chief of the Main Operational Directorate of the General Staff of the Russian Armed Forces Lt. Gen. Sergey Rudskoy said that since 30 September 2015 Russian air force had conducted 5,240 sorties in Syria, including 145 sorties by long-range aviation. On 27 December 2015, Chief Commander of the Russian Aerospace Force Col. Gen. Viktor Bondarev stated that Russian pilots had never once attacked civilian targets in Syria.

On 30 December 2015, heavy fighting was reported as the Syrian government forces backed by Russian air strikes advanced into the southern city of Al-Shaykh Maskin, which had been held by the rebel Southern Front since the First Battle of Al-Shaykh Maskin in December 2014. The Syrian government′s offensive operation that had started on 28 December 2015 and completed by the end of January 2016 was said to be the government's first major assault in southern Syria since Russia joined the fight.

In early January 2016, regional diplomats who had assumed Moscow had an understanding with Jordan and Israel not to extend into their sphere of influence were reported to be surprised by the growing Russian role in Syria′s south; so were rebels from Syria's Southern Front alliance whose forces were directly supplied by the Military Operations Command, an operations room staffed by Arab and Western military forces, including the US.

On 9 January 2016, Syrian Observatory for Human Rights reported that Russian air strikes in the northwestern town of Maarrat al-Nu'man had killed about 60 persons, including 23 members of the Nusra Front.

In January 2016, the cruiser Varyag was deployed off Syria′s shore replacing sister ship  and was named flagship of the Russian naval task force positioned in the eastern Mediterranean.

On 14 January 2016, the Russian defence ministry said that the first joint bombing mission had been performed by Russian air force Su-25 fighters and Syrian air force MiG-29 aircraft.

Russia′s role was said to be essential in the government′s capture, on 24 January 2016, of the town of Rabia, the last major town held by rebels in western Latakia province. The capture of Rabia, part of the government′s Latakia offensive, was said to threaten rebel supply lines from Turkey.

At the end of January 2016, Russia, for the first time, deployed four Su-35S fighter jets, presumably equipped with the Khibiny electronic countermeasures (ECM) systems, to the Khmeimim base; on 1 February the Russian defence ministry said the aircraft had begun conducting missions in Syria.

A Russian military adviser died in a hospital in Syria on 1 February after suffering severe wounds when a Syrian army training center in Homs Province was shelled. Speaking shortly after the formal start of the UN-mediated Geneva Syria peace talks on 1 February, Russian foreign minister Sergei Lavrov said Russia would not stop its air strikes until Russia truly defeated "such terrorist organisations as Jabhat al-Nusra and ISIL″.

In early February 2016, intensive Russian strikes contributed to the success of the Syrian army and its allies′ offensive operation to the northwest of Aleppo that severed a major rebel supply line to Turkey.

March 2016 – mid-October 2016

On 1 March 2016, Russian foreign minister Sergey Lavrov said that the truce, formally referred to as a "cessation of hostilities", that had been  in effect from 27 February 2016 at 00:00 (Damascus time), was largely holding and becoming more stable. According to the state–run RIA Novosti′s report of 1 March 2016, all the planes at the Russian Khmeimim base had been grounded for four days.

On 1 March, the Russian defense ministry said it had deployed to the Khmeimim base additional radars and drones: three sets of surveillance equipment which included drones and two radar stations.

On 14 March 2016, Russian president Vladimir Putin announced that the mission which he had set for the Russian military in Syria was "on the whole accomplished" and  ordered withdrawal of the "main part" of the Russian forces from Syria. The move was announced on the day when peace talks on Syria resumed in Geneva. The Russian leader, however, did not give a deadline for the completion of the withdrawal. He also said that both Russian military bases in Syria (naval base in Tartus and airbase in Khmeimim) will continue to operate in "routine mode", as the Russian servicemen there will be engaged in monitoring the ceasefire regime.

In mid-March 2016, intensive operations by the Russian forces resumed to support the Syrian government′s bid to recapture the city of Tadmur that includes the UNESCO World Heritage Site of Palmyra, which were fully recaptured from ISIS on 27 March. Following the recapture of the city, Russian de-mining teams engaged in the clearing of mines planted by ISIS in the ancient site of Palmyra.

In early May 2016, news media reported that Russian ground forces had set up what Jane's Information Group called a ″forward operating base″ (officially a base for the mining crews) just to the west of the city of Tadmur, and installed an air-defence system to protect the site.

In mid-May 2016, Stratfor reported that a Russian air base was attacked and four Russian attack helicopters, 20 supply trucks and one Syrian Mig-25 were destroyed. However, United States media cited intelligence community sources as believing the destruction was caused by an accidental fuel tank explosion, that the Stratfor analysis was wrong and that there were no indications of an ISIS attack on the airport.

On 8 July 2016, a Syrian Mi-25 (a Russian Mi-35, according to other unofficial military sources) was destroyed on the ground from a United States-made BGM-71 TOW east of Palmyra, with two Russian pilots confirmed dead. A few days after, Russia announced it had employed strategic Tu-22M3 bombers, for the first time since the partial ceasefire came into force, to deliver airstrikes on terrorist targets east of the towns of Palmyra and Al-Sukhnah, and the village of Arak.

On 1 August 2016, a Russian Mi-8AMTSh transport helicopter was shot down on its way back to the Khmeimim base from a humanitarian mission to Aleppo by ground fire over Jabhat Fateh al-Sham-controlled area in Idlib province. Three crew members and two officers from the Russian Reconciliation Center for Syria were killed in the crush, then their corpses were desecrated by the rebels arrived on the scene.

On 16 August 2016, Russian Tu-22M bombers and Su-34 strike fighters began to use Iran′s Hamedan Airbase for conducting raids over Syria.

For a period of time, from late June until the end of the Summer Aleppo campaign on 11 September, Russian Aerospace Forces and the Russian naval infantry advisors were heavily involved in the various battles against the rebels and their allies throughout the campaign.

Russia′s air force took active part in the Syrian government′s re-newed Aleppo offensive that began in late September 2016, one of the consequences being the U.S. government in early October suspending talks on Syria with Russia. The Russian tactics and weapons used in the offensive have been compared to those used in Grozny against Chechen separatists. The U.S. government publicly stated that Russia was committing ″flagrant violations of international law″ in Syria and urged investigation of war crimes.

Mid-October 2016 – December 2016

On 15 October 2016, the aircraft carrier  sailed from Kola Bay at the centre of a task group, which included the Kirov-class missile cruiser , a pair of s  and other vessels, to deploy to the Mediterranean in support of Russian forces operating in Syria. Admiral Kuznetsovs jets were reported to be flying off the Syrian coast on 8 November. On 14 November, a MiG-29K crashed en route back to the carrier following a planned mission over Syria, while an Su-33 crashed, again while trying to recover to Admiral Kuznetsov following a sortie on 5 December.

On 17 November 2016, the Russian ministry of defence said that three "well-known" commanders of Al-Qaeda's Syria affiliate formerly known as Al-Nusra Front, among other "terrorists", had been killed in Russian strikes fired by Su-33 fighter jets based on Admiral Kuznetsov, in the province of Idlib. Other ships as well as K-300P Bastion-P were also reported to have taken part in a renewed bombing campaign, after a partial hiatus in the raids since 18 October.

In late November, satellite images emerged showing several of Admiral Kuznetsovs fixed wing aircraft operating from Hmeimim Air Base in Latakia, with suggestions made that the number of sorties flown from the carrier is less than has been suggested by the Russian Ministry of Defence. Problems with the ship's arrestor cables was cited as being part of the reason for the crash of the MiG-29K, which was circling the ship when it suffered an engine failure. At around the same time, an image was released by the Dutch frigate  showing the  Mirazh being towed back to the Black Sea.

By mid-December 2016 the Syrian government, with the help of its allies including Russia, re-established control of Aleppo.

January 2017 – June 2017

On 1 January 2017, Russian and Turkish warplanes conducted joint airstrikes against ISIL as part of the Battle of al-Bab.

On 6 January, the Russian Defense Ministry, with a reference to a Moscow/Ankara-brokered ceasefire effective as of 30 December 2016, announced the start of a drawdown of its forces from Syria, pursuant to a decision taken by President Putin; the first element scheduled to depart the region was announced to be the Admiral Kuznetsov battle group. However, five days afterwards, a Fox News report cited ″two U.S. officials″ as saying that additional attack aircraft had been deployed by Russia to its airbase in Syria, namely four Su-25 jets had arrived on 9 January.

On 13 January, the Syrian Arab Army launched an offensive against ISIL in the Eastern Homs Governorate with the goal of recapturing Palmyra and its surrounding countryside. ISIL forces had retaken the city in a sudden counterattack. On 2 March 2017, the city of Palmyra was captured with the aid of Russian airstrikes and special operations forces according to Sergey Rudskoy, the chief of the General Staff’s operations department. On 5 March, a brand new offensive was launched which captured more than 230 square miles of territory around the city in a bid to expand the buffer zone around Palmyra.

On 20 March, it was reported that Russia set up a training base in Afrin Canton to train YPG units in order to combat terrorism, however there were conflicting reports about where this base was set up, with Reuters reporting it was in Jandairis and pro-government Al Masdar News locating it in the village of Kafr Jannah. At various times, Afrin was the target of artillery shelling by Islamist rebel groups as well as by Turkey. In response, Russian troops reportedly stationed themselves in Afrin as part of an agreement to protect the YPG from further Turkish attacks.

Russia scaled back its airstrikes in Syria in January and February, so that for the first time casualties due to US-led Coalition airstrikes in Syria and Iraq began to exceed casualties of Russian strikes in Syria. However, strikes increased in March 2017, with a reported 114 incidents with 165–292 reported non-combatant deaths, primarily in Idlib province, Hama and the Damascus eastern suburbs.

In response to the downing of a Syrian government Su-22 plane by a U.S. fighter jet near the town of Tabqah in Raqqa province on 18 June 2017,  Russia announced that U.S.-led coalition warplanes flying west of the Euphrates would be tracked by Russian anti-aircraft forces in the sky and on the ground and treated as targets; furthermore, the Russian military said they suspended the hotline with their U.S. counterparts based in Al Udeid. In the wake of the announcement, Australia suspended its military flights in Syria, while media reports stated that the U.S. might be edging towards a full-on confrontation with Russia and Iran in Syria. Nevertheless, on 27 June 2017, U.S. Secretary of Defense  Jim Mattis reassured the press: ″We deconflict with the Russians; it is a very active deconfliction line.  It is on several levels, from the chairman of the Joint Chiefs and the secretary of state with their counterparts in Moscow, General Gerasimov and Minister Lavrov. Then we've got a three-star deconfliction line that is out of the Joints Chiefs of Staff, out of the J5 there. Then we have battlefield deconfliction lines.  One of them is three-star again, from our field commander in Baghdad, and one of them is from our CAOC, our Combined Air Operations Center, for real-time deconfliction.″

July 2017 – December 2017

On 24 July, the Russian military announced that Russia had begun to deploy military police to Syria to monitor a cease-fire in two new safe (de-escalation) zones that had been envisaged in the plan on four safe zones, tentatively agreed upon by Russia, Iran, and Turkey in May, and mapped out in early July by Russia, the U.S, and Jordan: checkpoints and monitoring posts around safe zones in southwest Syria and in Eastern Ghouta were said to have been set up. Another such deployment was effected in early August — north of the city of Homs.

In August 2017, the Russian military announced that Al-Sukhnah town was captured from ISIS in early August with support of the Russian Aerospace Forces. Russian aviation said they had conducted 28,000 combat missions, and about 90,000 strikes as of late August 2017 during the operation in Syria.

On 5 September 2017, the Russian defence ministry said that the breaking of the three-year siege of Deir ez-Zor had been effected with active participation of Russian aviation and navy. President Putin congratulated both President Bashar Assad and the Russian commanders on "a very important strategic victory" (in his spokesman′s words). Humanitarian aid was delivered to pro-government inhabitants of the city by the Russian servicemen. The Russian aviation continued active support of the Syrian forces operating in Deir ez-Zor.

The Russian military on 12 September said that 85 percent of Syria's territory had been ″liberated from illegal armed formations″ and the operation would continue.

On 16 September, the U.S.-led coalition officials said Russian warplanes had bombed U.S.-backed militants in Deir ez-Zor, U.S. Special Operations Forces advising the SDF being "at most a couple of miles" away from where the bomb struck; the statement was denied by the Russian defence ministry.

According to the Russian defence ministry, the Military Police platoon (29 servicemen) deployed as part of the de-escalation observation forces in the Idlib de-escalation zone was on 19 September encircled by rebels, including Jabhat al-Nusra, as a result of their offensive against the Syrian troops positioned north and northeast of Hama; the encirclement was breached by Russian forces in a special operation leaving three servicemen of the Russian Special Operations Forces were wounded. The Russian ministry stated that according to their intelligence, the rebels′ ″offensive was initiated by the US special agencies in order to stop successful advance of the Syrian Arab Army to the east from Deir ez-Zor″. The Russian ministry′s statement on the U.S.′ role in the rebels′ offensive was the following day endorsed by president Vladimir Putin′s spokesman. On 21 September, the Russian MoD, in connection with what it called the U.S.-supported SDF having twice attacked positions of the Syrian Army in the Deir ez-Zor governorate with mortar and rocket fire, said: "Russia unequivocally told the commanders of U.S. forces in Al Udeid Air Base (Qatar) that it will not tolerate any shelling from the areas where the SDF are stationed. Fire from positions in regions [controlled by the SDF] will be suppressed by all means necessary." In early October, the Russian MoD continued to state that the U.S. forces were disguisedly supporting of the ISIL′s attacks on Syrian government forces, especially from the area at Al-Tanf, and stated: "If the United States views such operations as unforeseen 'coincidences,' then the Russian air force in Syria is prepared to begin the complete destruction of all such 'coincidences' in the zones under their control." The MoD statement of 6 October referred to ″unlawful establishment by the U.S. of [Al-Tanf] military base″ and called it ″a 100-kilometer black hole" on the Syria-Jordan border.

On 11 December, days after declaring Syria had been "completely liberated" from ISIL and with the campaign liberating the western bank of the Euphrates in its final days, Russian president Vladimir Putin visited the Russian base in Syria, where he announced that he had ordered the partial withdrawal of the forces deployed to Syria. Several hours later, Sergei Shoigu said the troops had already begun to return.

On 26 December, defence minister Sergey Shoigu said that Russia had set about ″forming a permanent grouping" at the Tartus naval facility and the Hmeymim airbase, after president Putin approved the structure and the personnel strength of the Tartus and Hmeymim bases. On the same day, the upper chamber of parliament approved the ratification of an agreement between Russia and Syria on expanding the Tartus naval facility, which envisages turning it into a full-fledged naval base.

January 2018 – August 2018

In January—February 2018, the Russian air force continued to provide combat support to the Syrian Army in its offensive operations in the Hama Governorate and the Idlib Governorate. The Russian forces stationed in Syria lost a Su-25SM in the Idlib province on 3 February 2018.

Following reports about multiple Russian private contractor casualties in the U.S. air and artillery strike on pro-government forces near the town of Khasham in the Deir ez-Zor Governorate that occurred on 7 February 2018, the contingent of regular Russian forces stationed in Syria appeared to have been reinforced, though numerous witnesses of the strike dismissed the reports as untrue and did not confirm Russian mercenary participation. Namely, in mid-February, several Russian newest fifth generation Sukhoi Su-57 fighter aircraft were deployed to the Khmeimim air base in Syria; the deployment was interpreted by commentators as a possible response to the deployment of U.S. fifth-generation Lockheed Martin F-22 Raptor, which took part in the 7 February strike.

In June and July 2018, Russian forces actively supported the Syrian Army in the successful execution of the Southern Syria offensive, which resulted in the Syrian government′s complete control of Daraa and Quneitra provinces. In August, Russia began to set up observation posts in Quneitra, along the UN-patrolled demilitarised zone in the Golan Heights; plans for eight such Russian-manned posts were announced. By mid-August, four such military police-manned posts along the Bravo line were set up.

At the end of August, the Russian media reported Russia was building up the largest ever naval grouping in eastern Mediterranean that included the cruiser Marshal Ustinov and all the three  frigates in service, including the latest Admiral Makarov. Speaking after talks with the Saudi Arabian foreign minister Adel al-Jubeir in Moscow on 29 August, Russia′s foreign minister, in a reference to the Idlib rebel-held enclave, said, "[T]his festering abscess needs to be liquidated.″ Additionally, the Russian Embassy in Washington, D.C. published ambassador Anatoly Antonov′s warning to the U.S. against ″yet another unprovoked and illegal aggression against Syria" on the pretext of a staged chemical attack.

On 30 August, the Russian MoD said it would conduct large-scale drills in eastern Mediterranean that would involve 25 ships and 30 planes. The drills would take place from 1 September until 8 September and the area would be closed for other countries′ vessels and aircraft. The announcement was made amidst reports of the impending Syrian government′s offensive in the Idlib province and anticipated military reaction on the part of the U.S.

September 2018 – March 2019

On 17 September 2018, during multiple missile strikes by Israeli F-16 jets at targets in western Syria, Russia′s Il-20 ELINT reconnaissance plane returning to Khmeimim Air Base, with 15 Russian servicemen on board, was inadvertently downed by a Syrian S-200 surface-to-air missile. Russia′s defence minister the following day blamed Israel′s military for the accident and re-affirmed its stance in a minute-by-minute report presented on 23 September. Early on 20 September, Russia′s government-run news agency reported Russia had announced multiple areas of eastern Mediterranean ″near Syria, Lebanon, and Cyprus" shut for air and sea traffic until 26 September, due to the Russian Navy′s drills in the area. Following the shoot down incident, Shoigu on 24 September said that within two weeks, the Syrian army would receive S-300 air-defense missile systems to strengthen Syria′s combat air defence capabilities; a series of other military measures were announced such as radio-electronic jamming of "satellite navigation, onboard radars and communications systems used by military aircraft attacking targets in Syrian territory", in the areas of the Mediterranean off the Syrian coast.

On 8 November, according to the Russian MOD, Russian special forces stationed at the Russian Reconciliation Center either directly participated or guided the Syrian Arab Army in a successful special operation which rescued all the 19 remaining hostages alive, held by ISIL north-east of Palmyra. Some reports stated the possibility of Russian special forces being covertly deployed in the province of al-Suwayda to support the Syrian Army advance on ISIS positions in the al-Safa area for the remainder of the offensive.

The Russian Ministry of Defense reported that 68,000 Russian army servicemen had so far taken part in the Syrian intervention by 3 January 2019.

On 8 January 2019, Russian military units began patrolling areas in and around the vicinity of Manbij, including Arima.

On 13 March 2019, the Russian defence ministry said its jets had bombed Hayat Tahrir al-Sham′s targets in the city of Idlib, the operation having been cleared with Turkey. According to mass media reports, a displacement camp, as well as a prison were hit.

April 2019 – September 2019

Fighting intensified in Idlib and nearby areas at the end of April 2019, Syrian and Russian forces striking the rebel targets.

On 13 June, the Russian military said fighting in the Idlib de-escalation zone had subsided as a result of a ceasefire agreement reached on Russia’s initiative that came into force the day prior.

By 10 July 2019, the government offensive in Idlib was judged to have reached a standstill, Russia’s ties with Turkey cited as the main brake on any full-scale attempt to take the entire northwest.

On 18 July, rebel commanders were cited by Reuters as saying that Russia had sent special forces to fight alongside Syrian army troops in northwestern Syria; Russia's defense ministry said these were false allegations.

On 29 August, the warplanes of Assad regime and Russia killed seven civilians in attacks in northwestern Syria. The region had been under cease-fire.

Officially, the campaign ended the next day on 30 August after a ceasefire was agreed upon by both the Syrian Arab Army and the rebels that would take effect on 31 August. Some skirmishes have taken place since September as fighting is still reported. Overall, it was a major advance in the Idlib deescalation zone for the Syrian Army after the complete liberation of Southern Idlib Governorate.

October 2019
On 13 October 2019, Russian ground forces, along with the Syrian army entered and took the SDF-held areas on northeastern Syria following an agreement reached between the SDF and the Syrian government, shortly after Turkey commenced its cross-border incursion into the Kurdish-dominated region and the U.S. troops withdrew from the area. Russia′s military police units began patrolling the town of Manbij.

November 2019 – September 2020

On 2 November 2019, Russian aviation struck a concentration of militants in the area of Jisr al-Shughur in the Idlib province. The massive bombing came two days after Bashar al-Assad issued an ultimatum to the militants in the area demanding that they leave or surrender.

On 24 November 2019, the Syrian Arab Army, supported by Russian airstrikes, launched "phase one" of the offensive against the rebels′ stronghold in the Idlib province, which was officially announced on 19 December following the collapse of ceasefire agreements. The Russian-supported Syrian government offensive successfully continued into 2020, achieving, among other objectives, the establishment of full government control of the area along the entire M5 highway for first time since 2012. Meanwhile, relations between Russia and Turkey, which was sending heavy armour and thousands of its regular troops to fight on the side of the rebels in a bid to stem the government offensive, strained significantly and direct Russian strikes on regular Turkish forces were reported, Turkey′s president Erdogan announcing an imminent Turkish intervention in the area. On 20 February, Turkish defence minister Hulusi Akar told the news media there should be "no doubt" that Turkey would activate the S-400 missile systems it had bought from Russia in 2019.

On 27 February 2020, according to reports from the scene, two Russian Su-34s conducted an airstrike on a Turkish military convoy killing at least 34 Turkish regular troops. Turkey did not officially blame Russia for the airstrike while Russia denied responsibility saying that the Syrian Air Force was likely behind the strike. According to Russia′s defence ministry, Turkish service people "were in the battle formations of terrorist groups" when they came under the fire of Syrian troops. Meanwhile, Russia ratcheted up efforts through both official statements and state-sponsored mass media aiming to drive home the message that Turkey itself was to blame for its fatalities as Turkish forces were not supposed to be in Syria in the first place.

On 2 March, Russian military announced that Russia′s Military Police forces had been deployed to Saraqib following weeks of heavy fighting for control of this strategic town that saw it change hands several times; the declared objective was to secure safe passage of vehicles and civilians travelling along the M4 and M5 highways.

On 15 March, Russian and Turkish forces started joint-patrols on the M4 highway as a part of a ceasefire agreement between Russia and Turkey. According to Turkish Foreign Minister Mevlut Cavusoglu, Russian military forces will patrol the southern side while Turkey's military will patrol to the north of the highway.

On 18 August, a Russian major general was killed and two servicemen were injured by a roadside bomb in Syria while en route to Hmeimim Air Base from Deir ez-Zor.

In mid-September, Russian news media published officially unverified reports about "most powerful strikes" carried out on 15 September by Russian aviation as well as Iskander missiles against "terrorists", including Tahrir al-Sham, near the town of Maarrat Misrin.

Since October 2020

On 26 October 2020, the Russian airstrike on a training base run by Faylaq al-Sham, a major rebel group backed by Turkey, in the town of Kafr Takharim was reported to have killed at least 78 Turkish-backed militia fighters.

On 19 April 2021, Russian warplanes executed airstrikes on militant facilities in central Syria, northeast the city of Palmyra according to the Russian Reconciliation Center in Syria. The Russian Defence Ministry claimed that some 200 militants along with 24 vehicles with weapons and 500 kilograms of ammunitions and explosives were destroyed in the operation without specifying the affiliation of the militants. The UK-based SOHR confirmed the airstrikes but stated that only 26 ISIS militants were killed in the region.

In May 2021, three Tu-22Ms became the first bombers deployed to the Khmeymim airbase in Syria with the aim of enhancing the stability in the region.

On 17 May 2022, a Russian operated S-300 missile system is said to have fired a missile at a F-16 operated by the IAF. If confirmed it would be the first time Russian forces have fired on Israeli jets. It is also possible Russian forces have handed the missile system over to Syrian forces.

In late May 2022, amid growing concerns of a new Turkish military incursion into northern Syria, Russia sent military reinforcements to Qamishli Airport including the deployment of a Russian Pantsir-S1 air defense system, reaffirming Russia's role in Syria amid the Russian invasion of Ukraine.

On 10 June 2022, Russia had conducted joint military exercises with the Syrian Army south of Idlib. Russia had also dispatched an additional eight military helicopters to Abu al-Duhur Military Airbase, south of Aleppo.

During the 2022 Russian invasion of Ukraine, Russia is reported to be withdrawing (since May) its troops from Syria as reinforcements to its dwindling forces in Ukraine; according to Moscow Times (16 September 2022), the re-deployment of Russia's last reserves in Syria is under way.

During the year of 2022, the SOHR reported that at least 3,935 airstrikes were conducted by Russian forces in 2022 and that 159 ISIS militants were killed and another 255 were injured by Russian airstrikes on Islamic State positions throughout the country.

Assessments of tactics and effectiveness 

By late February 2016, the Russian Air Force conducted around 60 airstrikes daily, while the American-led coalition averaged seven. Pro-government website Al-Masdar News said that these Russian airstrikes have proven particularly effective against the ISIS oil trade and supply routes in the Syrian Desert. An estimated 209 oil facilities were destroyed by the airstrikes, along with over 2,000 petroleum transports. By the time of the withdrawal of the "main part" of its forces in mid-March, Russia had conducted over 9,000 sorties over the course of five and a half months, while helping the Syrian Army capture 400 towns and regain 10,000 square kilometers of territory. The Russian military followed the Chechnya Counter-Insurgency model, and "a revanchist Russia, even with a stagnated mono-industrial economy surprised the international community with the pace of attack and will to sustain the operation."

In January 2016, a few months after the start of Russia's involvement in Syria, diplomat Ranjit Gupta wrote in The Commonwealth Journal of International Affairs, that the Russian reinforcement was a "godsend for Assad, greatly boosting the regime's sagging morale and that of its armed forces." Gupta continued:

In February 2016, Professor Fawaz A. Gerges of the London School of Economics opined the Russian military intervention had turned out to be a game-changer in the Syrian Civil War: ″Mr Putin's decision to intervene in Syria and shore up Mr Assad with new fighter jets, military advisers and advanced weapons stopped the bleeding of the Syrian army and allowed it to shift from defence to offence.″

Vincent R. Stewart, Director of the Defense Intelligence Agency, stated in February 2016 that the "Russian reinforcement has changed the calculus completely" and added that Assad "is in a much stronger negotiating position than he was just six months ago".

Western media and analysts conclude that Russia’s intervention in Syria kept Assad in power and even turned the tide of the war in his favour.

In the week following the start of combat missions, the website RealClear Defense, part of the RealClearPolitics group, published an assessment of the effectiveness of the Admiral Kuznetsov as a platform for airstrikes, noting the small size of its air group (estimated at a total of eight Su-33 and four MiG-29K aircraft), the difficulties with the MiG-29K, which is seen as the more effective platform for strike missions, the smaller amounts of smart weapons for the Su-33 (which is primarily a fleet air defence aircraft), and the lack of aircraft catapults on the carrier, which limits the take-off weight of its aircraft.

The Russian tactics and weapons used in the offensive have been compared to those used in the Battle of Grozny (1999–2000) against Chechen separatists.

Weapons and munitions employed 

Russian forces in Syria were reported to have used a mix of precision-guided munitions and unguided weapons. The October 2015 airstrikes were Russia's first operational use of precision-guided munitions, whose development in Russia lagged behind other major powers. The majority of weapons employed, however, were unguided. Most Russian jets employ the SVP-24 guidance system, which allows them to use unguided munitions with high precision, close to the precision of guided ones, with substantially smaller costs.

Russia also used cruise missiles launched from corvettes,  frigates, and Kilo-class submarines, as well as artillery in the form of howitzers and multiple rocket launchers. The air campaign was estimated to cost between $2.3 and $4 million a day in its early phase. The 3M-14T cruise missiles, that Russia has used extensively, cost roughly $1.2 million per unit.

Russian defense minister Sergei Shoigu said in August 2021 that Russia had tested more than 300 weapons over the course of its campaign in Syria.

Reports of civilian casualties and war crimes

According to Amnesty International, in late February 2016 Russian warplanes deliberately targeted civilians and rescue workers during their bombing campaign. The human rights group has documented attacks on schools, hospitals and civilian homes. Amnesty International also said that "Russia is guilty of some the most egregious war crimes" it had seen "in decades". The director of Amnesty's crisis response program, Tirana Hassan, said that after bombing civilian targets, the Russian warplanes "loop around" for a second attack to target the humanitarian workers and civilians who are trying to help those have been injured in the first sortie.

In February 2016, Human Rights Watch (HRW) reported extensive use of cluster munitions by Syria and Russia, in violation of United Nations resolution 2139 of 22 February 2014, which demanded that all parties end "indiscriminate employment of weapons in populated areas". HRW said that "Russian or Syrian forces were responsible for the attacks" and that the munitions were "manufactured in the former Soviet Union or Russia" and that some were of a type that had "not been documented as used in Syria" prior to Russia's involvement in the war, which they said, suggested that "either Russian aircraft dropped them or Russian authorities recently provided the Syrian government with more cluster munitions, or both". HRW also said that while neither Russia nor Syria are parties to the Cluster Munitions Convention, the use of such munitions contradicts statements issued by the Syrian government that they would refrain from using them.

In February 2016, Médecins Sans Frontières has said that either "Syrian regime" or Russian warplanes deliberately attacked a hospital in Ma'arrat al-Nu'man. The Syrian Observatory for Human Rights stated that it was Russian warplanes that destroyed the hospital.

In 2016, opposition activists and local witnesses have reported that Russia has used white phosphorus against targets in Raqqa and Idlib, causing civilian casualties with the weapons.

U.S. officials repeatedly stated that hospitals in Syria were attacked by Russian forces. The Syrian Observatory for Human Rights reported that by mid-February 2016, Russian air strikes had killed 1,000 civilians, including 200 children, since the initiation of the intervention in September 2015. In March 2016, Amnesty International reported "compelling evidence" of at least six such attacks. These reports, including the bombing of two hospitals by Russian Air Force planes, have been denied by Russian officials. In May 2016 the Russian delegation to the UN Security Council vetoed a statement condemning the air strikes on a refugee camp in Idlib on 5 May.

In June 2016, Russia Today, while reporting minister Shoigu's visit to Hmeymim air base, showed incendiary cluster bombs being loaded onto Russian airplanes, identified as RBK-500 ZAB-2.5SM due to clearly visible markings. After this information, inconsistent with official Russian statements, the video was removed but later reinstated and uploaded by RT. An editorial note below the video made no mention of the weapon, saying a frame in the video has caused "concern for personnel safety" because of a pilot's close-up. "Upon re-evaluation it was deemed that the frame did not pose any risks; it had since been restored and the video is up in its original cut," the RT statement said.

By the end of 2018, Airwars, which monitors reports of casualties of all airstrikes, had documented 2,730–3,866 civilian deaths in Syria in some 39,000 Russian strikes, including 690–844 children and 2,017 named victims, although Russia officially confirmed none of these. Russia stated it had flown 39,000 sorties (not strikes) as of late 2018. The annual total for 2018 according to Airwars was 730 strikes killing 2,169 civilians.

In May 2019 United Nations officials said the Russian and Syrian governments intentionally bombed eight hospitals in Idlib whose GPS coordinates were passed to Russia as part of agreed "deconfliction mechanism" with hope to prevent "accidental bombing" which was previously used as an excuse by the governments.

In August 2019, over 19 civilians were killed within two days after Russian forces carried out air-raids on a “displaced persons camp” near Hass village in southern Idlib. Also in August, the UN has opened an investigation into the bombing of hospitals.

In October 2019, The New York Times published further evidence of coordinated attacks of Russian aviation against hospitals on the "deconfliction list", consisting of airplane sightings, intercepted radio conversations of pilots and air control exchanging GPS coordinates of specific hospitals which were bombed soon after.

The Airwars report for 2019 recorded 710 claimed Russian casualty events in Syria – a 3% fall on 2018 – killing between 1,099 and 1,745 civilians.  81% of the events were in Idlib, 13% in Hama, and 5% in Aleppo. The strikes mainly occurred during the Idlib offensive of May to September, with the single worst incident being the July 22nd strikes in Ma'arrat al-Numan which killed up to 42 civilians. A New York Times investigation confirmed Russia's culpability in the latter. The investigation also detailed Russian attacks on the Martyr Akram Ali Ibrahim Al-Ahmad School in Qalaat al-Madiq on 28 April 2019.

A 2020 report by UN Human Rights Council for the first time directly laid responsibility on Russian Air Force of indiscriminate attacks on civilian targets "amounting to a war crime" referring specifically to extensive evidence on bombing of refugee shelter in Haas and market place in Ma’arrat al-Nu’man in summer 2019.

By August 2022, Airwars estimated 4,308-6,386 civilians killed from Russian airstrikes since 2015, including 1,151-1,403 children, 627-760 women, and 3,192 named victims. The Russian military has denied that any of its strikes have caused any civilian casualties in Syria. Russian bombing has also injured 6,508-10,169 people.

Wagner group involvement 

The presence of the Wagner Group private military contractors (PMCs) in Syria was first reported in late October 2015, almost a month after the start of the Russian military intervention in the country's civil war, when between three and nine PMCs were killed in a rebel mortar attack on their position in Latakia province. It was reported that the Wagner Group was employed by the Russian Defense Ministry, even though private military companies are illegal in Russia. The Russian Defense Ministry dismissed the early reports by The Wall Street Journal about the Wagner Group's operations in Syria as an "information attack". However, sources within the Russian FSB and the Defense Ministry unofficially stated for RBTH that Wagner was supervised by the GRU.

Wagner PMCs were notably involved in both Palmyra offensives in 2016 and 2017, as well as the Syrian Army's campaign in central Syria in the summer of 2017 and the Battle of Deir ez-Zor in late 2017. They were in the role of frontline advisors, fire and movement coordinators forward air controllers who provided guidance to close air support and "shock troops" alongside the Syrian Army.

Besides fighting ISIL militants, according to RBK TV, the PMCs trained a Syrian Army unit called the ISIS Hunters, which was also fully funded and trained by Russian special forces.

In early February 2018, the PMCs took part in a battle at the town of Khasham, in eastern Syria, which resulted in heavy casualties among Syrian government forces and the Wagner Group as they were engaged by United States air and artillery strikes, due to which the incident was billed by media as "the first deadly clash between citizens of Russia and the United States since the Cold War".

Subsequently, the Wagner Group took part in the Syrian military's Rif Dimashq offensive against the rebel-held Eastern Ghouta, east of Damascus. The whole Eastern Ghouta region was captured by government forces on 14 April 2018, effectively ending the near 7-year rebellion near Damascus.

The PMCs also took part in the Syrian Army's offensive in northwestern Syria that took place mid-2019.

As of late December 2021, Wagner PMCs were still taking part in military operations against ISIL cells in the Syrian desert.

Cooperation with Iran 

Iran continues to officially deny the presence of its combat troops in Syria, maintaining that it provides military advice to President Assad's forces in their fight against terrorist groups. It is stated that the Syrian Arab Army receives substantial support from the Quds Force; in June 2015, some reports suggested that the Iranian military were effectively in charge of the Syrian government troops on the battlefield.

After the loss of Idlib province to a rebel offensive in the first half of 2015, the situation was judged to have become critical for Assad's survival. High level talks were held between Moscow and Tehran in the first half of 2015 and a political agreement was achieved; on 24 July, ten days after the signing of the nuclear agreement between Iran and the P5+1 countries, General Qasem Soleimani visited Moscow to devise the details of the plan for coordinated military action in Syria.

In mid-September 2015, the first reports of new detachments from the Iranian Revolutionary Guards arriving in Tartus and Latakia in western Syria were made. With much of the Syrian Arab Army and National Defence Force units deployed to more volatile fronts, Russian Marines and the Iranian Revolutionary Guard Corps (IRGC) have relieved their positions by installing military checkpoints inside the cities of Slunfeh (east Latakia Governorate), Masyaf (East Tartus Governorate) and Ras al-Bassit (Latakia coastal city). There were also further reports of new Iranian contingents being deployed to Syria in early October 2015. After the start of the Russian operation, it was generally thought that Iran will be playing a leading role in the ground operations of Syria's army and allies, whilst Russia will be leading in the air in conjunction with the Syrian Arab Air Force, thereby establishing a complementary role.

After the meeting between Vladimir Putin and Ali Khamenei in Tehran on 23 November 2015, Iran was said to have made a decision to unify its stance vis-a-vis the Syrian leadership with Russia's.

The use of Iran′s Hamadan Airbase by Russian military aircraft that began in mid-August 2016 marked a new level of cooperation between the countries in their support for the Syrian government

Reactions

Syria

:
 On 1 October 2015, the Syrian Ambassador to Russia, Riyad Haddad, stated that the Russian air force is acting in full coordination with the Syrian army. He added that Syria's position is that the Russian intervention is the only legitimate intervention under international law and called for other countries to join the "non-criminal" Russian intervention in Syria.

International

Supranational 
United Nations – On 31 October 2015, UN Secretary General Ban Ki-moon said in an interview with Spanish daily El Mundo "The future of Assad must be decided by the Syrian people," and "The Syrian government states that President Assad takes part (in any transitional government) but others, especially Western countries, say there is no place for him, but because of that we have lost three years, there have been more than 250,000 dead, more than 13 million displaced within Syria... more than 50 percent of hospitals, schools and infrastructure have been destroyed. There's no time to lose."

In 2016, retired war crimes prosecutor Carla Del Ponte, who was researching rights abuses in Syria as part of the Independent International Commission of Inquiry on the Syrian Arab Republic, told an interviewer "I think the Russian intervention is a good thing, because finally someone is attacking these terrorist groups", but added that Russia is not distinguishing enough between terrorist and other groups. In 2017, she complained that Russia was using its UN Security Council veto to prevent prosecution of war crimes in Syria, leading her to resign from her role in Syria.

 – NATO has condemned Russian air strikes and urged Russia to stop supporting Syrian President Bashar al-Assad. On 8 October 2015, they renewed assurances to defend the allies in view of the "escalation of Russian military activities."

U.S.-led coalition – On 1 October 2015, participants in the United States-led anti-ISIL coalition called on Russia to curtail its air campaign in Syria, saying the airstrikes had hit Syrian opposition groups and civilians. Such strikes would "only fuel more extremism", the statement issued by the United States, UK, Turkey and other coalition members declared. "We call on the Russian Federation to immediately cease its attacks on the Syrian opposition and civilians and to focus its efforts on fighting ISIL." United States President Barack Obama, at a news conference on 2 October, underscored the coalition statement by saying the Russian action was driving moderate opposition groups underground, and would result in "only strengthening" ISIL.

In 2017, the Inter-parliamentary Assembly of the Community for Democracy and Rights of Nations, an international organization consisting of the only partially recognized republics Abkhazia, South Ossetia and Transnistria, adopted a joint statement in which supported the policy of the Russian Federation in Syria.

National governments 
 provides support for the Russian operations in Syria by providing operational and logistical support. As a member of the CSTO, Armenia supports the Russian military intervention.

, also a member of the CSTO, supports the Russian military intervention in Syria, said the country's acting foreign minister Vladimir Makei in October 2015.

 has reacted positively to Russia's military intervention in Syria. The Chinese government perceives it as an element of the global fight against terrorism. China has no interest in getting involved militarily in Syria, but China's special envoy for the crisis in Syria praised Russia's military role in the war. In August 2016, Guan Youfei, director of the Office for International Military Cooperation of China's Central Military Commission, was in Damascus and said that "China and Syria's militaries have a traditionally friendly relationship, and China's military is willing to keep strengthening exchanges and cooperation with Syria's military".

 voiced support of the Russian air operation.  On 3 October 2015, Foreign Minister Sameh Shoukry said the Russian entry into war in Syria was bound "to have an effect on limiting terrorism in Syria and eradicating it."

 supports the Russian intervention in Syria and has permitted Russia to fly over Iraq with its war planes.

 – Shortly prior to the Russian intervention, the Israel Defense Forces and Russian military had set up a joint working group to coordinate their Syria-related activities in the aerial, naval, and electromagnetic arenas. The Israeli government was primarily concerned about ensuring that the potential alliance between Hezbollah and Russia is not detrimental to its security. According to Zvi Magen, former ambassador to Moscow, "Israel made clear to him [Putin] that we have no real problem with Assad, just with Iran, Hezbollah and ISIS, and that message was understood." An Israeli military official stated that Israel would not shoot down any Russian aircraft which accidentally overflew Israeli territory because "Russia is not an enemy".

 – On 23 October 2015, Jordan agreed to set up a "special working mechanism" in Amman to coordinate military actions with Russia in Syria. Russian foreign minister, Sergey Lavrov called for continued expansion of the alliance, saying "We think that other states that participate in the anti- terrorist fight can join this mechanism as well."

 – Kyrgyz President Almazbek Atambayev said that his country (also a member of the CSTO) supports the intervention.

 – On 1 October 2015, Saudi Arabia′s senior diplomat at the UN demanded that Russia cease its intervention, repeating statements made by Western diplomats that Russia was targeting the unnamed "moderate" anti-government opposition rather than ISIL.

 – President Recep Tayyip Erdoğan, after a series of reported violations of the country′s airspace by Russian military aircraft in early October 2015, warned that Russia's military operation in Syria could jeopardise the bilateral ties between the countries. On 23 December, co-leader of Turkey's pro-Kurdish Peoples' Democratic Party Selahattin Demirtaş criticized Ankara's stance regarding a Russian jet shot down by Turkey in November 2015.

 – Initially, the UAE did not comment on the Russian intervention. Foreign Minister Anwar Mohammed Qarqash later expressed support for the intervention, saying they were against a "common enemy".

 – Prime Minister David Cameron said "It's absolutely clear that Russia is not discriminating between ISIL and the legitimate Syrian opposition groups and, as a result, they are actually backing the butcher Assad and helping him". British troops will be sent to the Baltic states and Poland following Russia's intervention in Syria "to respond to any further provocation and aggression".

 – In early October 2015, President Barack Obama was reported to have authorised the resupply—against ISIL—of 25,000 Syrian Kurds and 5,000 of the armed-Syrian opposition, emphasising that the United States would continue this support now that Russia had joined the conflict.
The U.S. ruled out military cooperation with Russia in Syria. Secretary of Defense Ashton Carter and other senior U.S. officials said Russia's campaign was primarily aimed at propping up Assad, whom Obama has repeatedly called upon to leave power. On 8 October 2015, he said, at a meeting of NATO defence ministers in Brussels, that Russia would soon start paying the price for its military intervention in Syria in the form of reprisal attacks and casualties. He added that he expected "in the next few days the Russians will begin to lose in Syria." He further said Russia's campaign was primarily aimed at propping up Assad.
On 9 October, the Obama administration abandoned its efforts to build up a new rebel force inside Syria to combat the Islamic State, acknowledging the failure of its $500 million campaign to train thousands of fighters and announcing that it will instead use the money to provide ammunition and some weapons for groups already engaged in the battle.

On 24 November, Obama said that Turkey "has a right to defend its territory and its airspace" after it shot down a Russian bomber for reportedly violating Turkish airspace for 17 seconds, near the Syrian border. Obama also said "[Russians] are going after moderate opposition that are supported by not only Turkey but a wide range of countries." Syrian government forces supported by the Russian air force were fighting against an alliance that included the Turkish-backed Syrian Turkmen Brigades and al-Qaeda's Syrian affiliate the al-Nusra Front.

Militias and religious agents
Representatives of the Kurdish YPG and PYD expressed their support for Russian air strikes against Islamic State, al-Nusra Front and Ahrar al-Sham. They also asked for Russian help in weaponry and for the cooperation with Russia in the fight against Islamic State. Shortly after the Russian air strikes started, Salih Muslim, co-chair of the PYD, has said in an interview that "America will object because [Jabhat] al-Nusra and Ahrar al-Sham are no different than Daesh. They are all terrorist organizations and share the same radical mentality."

On 30 September, Russian Orthodox Church spokesman Vsevolod Chaplin, said the fight against terrorism was a "moral fight, a holy fight if you will". According to The Washington Post, "Russian Muslims are split regarding the intervention in Syria, but more are pro- than anti-war."

Over 40 anti-government groups, including factions such as Ahrar al-Sham, Jaysh al-Islam and the Levant Front, were reported, on 5 October, to have vowed to attack Russian forces in retaliation for Moscow's air campaign.

Al-Qaeda's Syrian affiliate al-Nusra Front has set a reward for the seizure of Russian soldiers of LS 2,500,000 (approximately US$13,000). Abu Ubaid Al-Madani, who speaks Russian, released a video addressed to the Russians warning that they would massacre Russian soldiers. Abu Mohammad al-Julani called for Russian civilians to be attacked by former Soviet Muslims and called for attacks on Alawite villages in Syria.

The Syria-based, Al-Qaeda linked Saudi cleric Abdallah Muhammad Al-Muhaysini threatened that Syria would be a "tomb for its invaders" or "graveyard for invaders" in response to the Russian intervention and brought up the Soviet–Afghan War. Muhaysini had foreign fighters of multiple backgrounds repeated the phrase "The Levant is the graveyard of the Russians", in a video message.

The Islamic State of Iraq and the Levant declared Jihad upon the Russians in a recorded vocal communiqué by Abu Mohammed al-Adnani. On 12 November, ISIL published via its media branch, al-Hayat Media Center a music video in which they threatened that they would attack Russia very soon and "blood would spill like an ocean".

The Muslim Brotherhood of Syria issued a statement declaring Jihad against Russia obligatory (Fard 'ayn) upon all who are able to carry weapons. They cited the Russian Orthodox Church's call of the operation as a Holy War.

Fifty-five Saudi religious scholars signed a statement against the Russian intervention, first addressing the Russians as "Oh Russians, oh extremist people of the Cross", reminding them of the Soviet invasion of Afghanistan and addressing Orthodox Russia as the heir of the Soviet Communists, stating they were "supporting the Nusayri regime" and invading "Muslim Syria", stating the leaders of the Russian Orthodox Church were declaring a "Crusade" and telling them they will meet the fate of the Soviet Union and suffer "a shameful defeat in the Levant". The statement also addressed "Our people in the Levant", telling the able-bodied and those who are able to contribute to join the "Jihad" instead of emigrating. The statement also called for all factions against the government in Syria to unite. Further, addressing "Arab and Muslim countries", telling them that there is a "real war against Sunnis and their countries and identity" at the hands of the "Western-Russian and Safavid and Nusayri alliance", calling for the termination of all relations with Iran and Russia with Muslim countries and to "protect the land and people of the Levant from the influence of the Persians and Russians", especially calling upon Qatar, Turkey, and Saudi Arabia to support the Levant.

The Free Syrian Army's "Homs Liberation Movement" threatened suicide bombings against Russians in Syria.

Photos of Uyghur fighters of the Turkistan Islamic Party were released with captions in Arabic that said "standing up strongly to the Nusayri army and the Russians." (المجاهدين التركستانيين يتصدى بقوة للجيش النصيري ومن قبل الروس).

A Turkmen opposition group allied with the Free Syrian Army and al-Nusra Front stated that Russian air forces conducted simultaneous air strikes against Turkmen villages and positions in the Turkmen Mountain area. More than 40 civilian casualties were reported in one incident.

See also 

 List of aviation shootdowns and accidents during the Syrian Civil War- That include Russian aircraft lost during the Syrian Civil War.
 Military history of the Russian Federation
 Humanitarian aid provided by Russia during the War in Syria
 Russian Armed Forces casualties in Syria
 Timeline of the Syrian Civil War (August–December 2015)

References

Further reading

External links
 
 Russian Ministry of Defence Syria 

 
Military intervention
2015 in Russia
2015 in the Syrian civil war
Russia–Turkey military relations
Iran–Russia military relations
Articles containing video clips
Military operations of the Syrian civil war involving the Syrian government
Russia–Syria military relations
Naval history of Russia